Bridgewater is a surname. Notable people with the surname include:
, Hong Kong Actress having British, Chinese and Malaysian ancestry
Brad Bridgewater (born 1973), American swimmer
Carl Bridgewater (1965–1978), murdered newspaper boy, UK
Dee Dee Bridgewater (born 1950), American jazz singer
Cecil Bridgewater (born 1942), American jazz trumpeter and composer
John Bridgewater (1532–1596), English clerical historian
Teddy Bridgewater (born 1992), American football player